The U.S. commonwealth of Puerto Rico first required its residents to register their motor vehicles and display license plates in 1906. Only rear plates have been required since 1976.

Passenger baseplates 1930 to present
The 1955 (dated 1956) issue was the first Puerto Rico license plate that complied with these standards. However, in 2012 the Puerto Rican government began issuing optional European-style plates that incorporate the design language of the standard-issue plates in a longer and narrower size typically seen in Europe.

Optional plates

Non-passenger plates

See also

 List of highways in Puerto Rico

References

External links
 
 Plateshack.com - Puerto Rico Y2K

+Puerto Rico
Puerto Rico transport-related lists
Transportation in Puerto Rico